Ferreira's fish-eating rat (Neusticomys ferreirai) is a species of rodent in the family Cricetidae.
It is known only from primary lowland tropical rainforest. It is named after 18th-century Brazilian naturalist Alexandre Rodrigues Ferreira.

References

Mammals of Brazil
Neusticomys
Mammals described in 2005
Taxa named by Alexandre Reis Percequillo